Irena Szewińska (née Kirszenstein;; 24 May 1946 – 29 June 2018) was a Polish sprinter who was one of the world's foremost athletes for nearly two decades, in multiple events. She is the only athlete in history, male or female, to have held the world record in the 100 m, the 200 m and the 400 m.

Personal life
Irena Kirszenstein was born in Leningrad to a Jewish-Polish family. Her father came from Warsaw and mother from Kiev. They met in Samarkand where they studied at the time, and in 1947 moved to Warsaw.

In 1967, she married her coach, Janusz Szewiński, who also competed in hurdles at the national level and later worked as a sports photographer. They have two sons, Andrzej Szewiński (born 1970), who played volleyball for the Poland men's national volleyball team and later became a senator, and Jarosław (born 1981).

In 1970, Szewińska graduated from the University of Warsaw with an MSc degree in economics.

On 29 June 2018, her death was announced by her husband Janusz Szewiński. She died of cancer aged 72 in Warsaw at the Military Institute of Medicine on Szaserów Street. Irena Szewińska was buried as a Catholic at the "Avenue of the Meritorious" in the Powązki Military Cemetery in Warsaw.

In 2020, she was posthumously honoured with a World Athletics Heritage Plaque, one of the first ever awarded, during a ceremony before the Szewinska Memorial meeting in Bydgoszcz. In 2021 she was voted Polish Sportsperson of the Century by the readers of the Przegląd Sportowy magazine. During her career, she had been elected as Polish Sports Personality of the Year four times by the same magazine.

Career
Between 1964 and 1980 she participated in five Olympic Games, winning seven medals, three of them gold. She also broke six world records and is the only athlete (male or female) to have held a world record in the 100 m, 200 m and the 400 m events. She also won 10 medals in European Championships. Between 1965 and 1979 she gathered 26 national titles and set 38 records in the 100–400 m sprint and long jump.

At her first Olympics in Tokyo in 1964, she took a silver medal in the long jump and 200 metres, and ran the second leg of the gold medal-winning 4 × 100 metres relay team.

She was a double sprint winner at the World Student Games in Budapest in 1965. In the same year she set her first world record, breaking Wyomia Tyus' 11.2 s from the previous year with an 11.1 s clocking in Prague, Czechoslovakia, July 9, 1965.

In 1966, at the European Athletics Championships she won Gold in the long jump, 200 metres and 4 × 100 metres relay; and took a silver in the 100 metre sprint.

At her second Olympics in Mexico, She won a bronze in the 100 metres, but failed to qualify for the Long Jump final. She recovered from that disappointment, to win the gold medal in the 200 metres in a new world-record time. In the sprint relay the Polish team dropped the baton on the final exchange in the semi-final and finished last.

After giving birth to her son, in 1971, she managed a bronze medal in the long jump at the European Championships in Helsinki. She would compete in the three events at the Munich Olympics in 1972, the two sprints and the long jump. She would come away with a bronze medal in the 200 metres.

In the 1974 season, she became the first woman to break the 50-second barrier for 400 metres, and she set a new world record of 22.21 s for 200 metres. At the European Championships in the Rome she won the sprint double of 100 metres and 200 metres, beating the favoured GDR sprinter Renate Stecher; and ran the anchor leg on the 4 × 100 metres relay team which took the bronze.  She was ranked number 1 in the world in the 100, 200 and 400 m events in 1974.

She would win her final Olympic medal in Montreal in 1976, by winning the gold in the 400 metres in a world record time of 49.28. At the inaugural World Cup of Track and Field in 1977, she would win both 200 metres and 400 metres; beating both favoured East German runners Bärbel Wöckel and Marita Koch respectively. She would be ranked number 1 in the world for 200 m and 400 m in 1976 and 1977.

In her final appearance at the European Championships at 32 year of age, she managed to win a bronze in the 400 metres and the 4 × 400 metres relay.

She was ranked number 1 in the world 7 times in the 200 metres; 4 times in the 400 metres, and 2 times in the 100 metres; as well as 3 times in the long jump. Over-all, she was ranked 15 years in the top ten at 200 metres, also 4 times number 2, twice at number 3, which just leaves 2 years outside the top 3; (from 1964 to 1977 she was ranked in the top 3 – 200 metre runners in the world) a remarkable achievement. She was ranked 12 times in the 100 metres, 8 times in the long jump and 6 times in the 400 metres (which she took up in 1974).

She obtained United Press International Athlete of the Year Award, Female 1974. She won the European Sportsperson of the Year presented by the Polish Press Agency twice in 1966 and 1974.

In 1998, Szewińska became a member of the International Olympic Committee. She was the president of the Polish Athletic Association 1997–2009.

On 3 August 2005, she was elected as the third woman to the IAAF (International Association of Athletics Federations) Council during the first session of the 45th IAAF Congress in Helsinki.

She was a member of the International Jewish Sports Hall of Fame, and the IAAF Hall of Fame.

International competitions

1Representing Europe

See also

Polish records in athletics
Poland at the Summer Olympics
List of Poles

References

External links
 
 
 
 Jews in Sports
 KIRSZENSTEIN-SZEWIŃSKA, Irena International Who's Who. accessed 4 September 2006.

1946 births
2018 deaths
20th-century Polish Jews
Jewish female athletes (track and field)
Polish female sprinters
Olympic athletes of Poland
Olympic gold medalists for Poland
Olympic silver medalists for Poland
Olympic bronze medalists for Poland
International Olympic Committee members
Athletes (track and field) at the 1964 Summer Olympics
Athletes (track and field) at the 1968 Summer Olympics
Athletes (track and field) at the 1972 Summer Olympics
Athletes (track and field) at the 1976 Summer Olympics
Athletes (track and field) at the 1980 Summer Olympics
Athletes from Saint Petersburg
Polish female long jumpers
European Athletics Championships medalists
Medalists at the 1976 Summer Olympics
Medalists at the 1972 Summer Olympics
Medalists at the 1968 Summer Olympics
Medalists at the 1964 Summer Olympics
Olympic gold medalists in athletics (track and field)
Olympic silver medalists in athletics (track and field)
Olympic bronze medalists in athletics (track and field)
Universiade medalists in athletics (track and field)
Soviet emigrants to Poland
Polish people of Ukrainian-Jewish descent
Deaths from cancer in Poland
Track & Field News Athlete of the Year winners
Universiade gold medalists for Poland
Medalists at the 1965 Summer Universiade